Branton is a village and former civil parish, now in the parish of Ingram, in Northumberland, England. In 1951 the parish had a population of 50.

Governance 
Branton is in the parliamentary constituency of Berwick-upon-Tweed. Branton was formerly a township in Eglingham parish, from 1866 Branton was a civil parish in its own right until it was abolished on 1 April 1955 and merged with Ingram.

References

External links

Villages in Northumberland
Former civil parishes in Northumberland
Ingram, Northumberland